Fluclorolone is a synthetic glucocorticoid corticosteroid which was never marketed. The acetonide cyclic ketal of fluclorolone, fluclorolone acetonide, in contrast, has been marketed.

References

Chloroarenes
Diketones
Fluoroarenes
Glucocorticoids
Pregnanes
Triols